Aleksei Mikhailovich Chaly (born 13 June 1961) is a businessman and formerly de facto mayor of Sevastopol. He declared himself mayor in February 2014, amidst the Crimean crisis, after the resignation of Volodymyr Yatsuba, the Viktor Yanukovych-appointed mayor. With Chaly as mayor, Sevastopol participated in the March 2014 referendum in which Crimea voted to separate itself politically from Ukraine and accede to Russia. On 1 April 2014 he was appointed as Governor of Sevastopol City by Russia. On 14 April, he was replaced by Sergey Menyaylo.

Biography

Chaly was born on 13 June 1961 in Moscow to students of the Moscow Power Engineering Institute. Parents: inventor and scientist Michail Chaly, mother Alevtina Chalaya, Candidate of Engineering, university professor. Grandson to Soviet vice-admiral Vasily Chaly, hero of the Great Patriotic War, Commander-In-Chief of the Black Sea Squadron (1956–1961). The family moved to Sevastopol, Ukrainian SSR when he was one year old. Chaly graduated from the Sevastopol National Technical University. Since 1987 he has been the head of "Tavrida Electric", producing switchgear and anti-wreck technology. At the moment of political crisis in Ukraine in 2014 he had Russian citizenship.

He was involved with restoration of the memorials of the World War II, producing the documentary series "Sevastopol Tales". In 2011 he received the international award "For faith and fidelity" as a symbol of recognition of his contribution to the Motherland.

During the Crimean crisis

On 23 February 2014, a meeting of citizens opposed to the Euromaidan movement that ousted the Ukrainian government from power in Kyiv led to Chaly being proclaimed as "mayor" of Sevastopol. The Sevastopol City Council handed power to Chaly on 24 February, following the resignation of Volodymyr Yatsuba as the city administrator appointed by the President of Ukraine (at the time the city had no elected mayor).

On 26 February, Chaly declared that Sevastopol would not submit to orders of the acting leader of the Ukrainian home office, Arsen Avakov. Simultaneously, he invited officers of the officially disbanded Berkut riot police unit to the city. He said that they can become a basis for future defence groups in the city.

Chaly visited the Kremlin in Moscow on 18 March 2014 to sign the Treaty on Accession of the Republic of Crimea to Russia together with Russian President Vladimir Putin and Crimean Prime Minister Sergey Aksyonov.

In March 2014, the Security Service of Ukraine has announced an investigation into Chaly for allegedly steering some ₴23.9 million from his charitable organisation to bankroll anti-Ukraine activity.

On 1 April 2014 he was appointed as acting Governor of Sevastopol City by Russia and occupied this position till 14 April 2014, when he resigned and was replaced by Sergey Menyaylo.

References

External links
 Biography of Chaly at the Sevastopol News
 The Sevastopol city council

1961 births
Living people
People from Sevastopol
Russian activists
Place of birth missing (living people)
People of the annexation of Crimea by the Russian Federation
Recipients of the Order "For Merit to the Fatherland", 1st class
Pro-Russian people of the 2014 pro-Russian unrest in Ukraine
Russian individuals subject to European Union sanctions